Camilla Hansson (born 11 October 1988) is a Swedish celebrity, actress, fashion model and beauty pageant titleholder who was crowned Miss Sweden 2014 and represented her country at the Miss Universe 2014 pageant. Previously, she was crowned as Miss Earth Sweden 2012 but did not place at the Miss Earth 2012.

Early life
Since the age of eighteen Hansson lives and resides in London, England.

Pageantry

Miss Earth Sweden 2012
Hansson was crowned as the second title of Miss Universe Sweden pageant, Miss Earth Sweden 2012.

Miss Earth 2012
Hansson represented Sweden at Miss Earth 2012 in Manila, Philippines. She held the title of Miss Earth Sweden 2012.

Miss Universe Sweden 2014
Hansson was crowned as Miss Sweden 2014 or called as Miss Universe Sweden 2014 on 28 March 2014.

Miss Universe 2014
Camilla Hansson was crowned Miss Universe Sweden 2014.

Awards and Achievements

References

External links

Living people
Swedish beauty pageant winners
Swedish female models
1988 births
Miss Earth 2012 contestants
Miss Universe 2014 contestants